Thema protogramma is a species of  moth of the family Oecophoridae and occurs in Australia.

Moths of Australia
Oecophoridae
Moths described in 1884